Gil Seong-joon (Korean: 길성준, Hanja: 吉成俊; born December 24, 1977), better known by his stage name Gill, is a South Korean singer and television personality. He was the main singer of former South Korean hip-hop duo, Leessang.

In 2009, Gil joined Infinite Challenge as a guest and, later on, as a regular co-host. Gil also co-hosted Come To Play.
In 2012, Gil joined Voice of Korea as one of the coaches and continued for Season 2. He was caught by police for DUI incident in April 2014 and eventually resigned from any public activity including Infinite Challenge and made the comeback in TV program as a producer for Mnet's hip-hop survival program, Show Me The Money 5, in 2016.

Personal life 

Gil said that when he was 5 years old, his father fainted, causing him to be disabled. To cure him, they put their house on auction. Gil's father was immobile for about a decade before he started to talk and walk again.

Career

Infinite Challenge (2009-2014) 
Gil made his first appearance on an episode which featured Korean figure skater Kim Yuna in April 2009, ostensibly substituting for Jeong Jun-ha, who had to leave the episode recording early. He remained a de facto member of Infinite Challenge until he became a full member later that year. During the Boxing episodes in January 2010, Gil showed off his 9-year-long training in the sport. Gil is often called the Unfunny Friend due to his inability to ad-lib as quickly as the other co-hosts.

In 2012, both of Leesang members, Gil and Gary, who worked as the main concert organizer of Infinite Challenge: Super 7 concert announced their departure from their respective variety shows, because of high ticket price protests. The concert itself eventually canceled. On the other hand, they still continued their participation as variety show cast after the controversy calmed down.

The Voice Korea (2012-2013) 
With his commentaries, Gil has shown that underneath his rugged hip-hop exterior, he is a warm and rather approachable individual. Consistently offering warm words of encouragement and advice to his disciples to help them ease their anxious hearts, and lightening up the atmosphere with his witty sense of humor, he has become an indispensable personality on the program.

Hiatus (2014) 
After the DUI incident, he took a hiatus from any public activities including TV appearances and concerts.

Show Me The Money (2016) 
Gill joined MNET's fifth season of the TV rap competition Show Me the Money in 2016 as one of the producers with Mad Clown as Team Gill & Mad Clown.

Discography

EP 
 R.O.A.D. Project #1 (2015)

Singles 

"Refrigerator" (냉장고) with Verbal Jint & Lee Hi (May 28, 2016)

Variety shows

Awards

References

External links

 

1977 births
South Korean hip hop singers
Infinite Challenge members
Jungle Entertainment artists
Leessang members
Living people
Music promoters
People from Seoul
South Korean comedians
South Korean hip hop record producers
South Korean male rappers
South Korean music industry executives
South Korean television personalities
21st-century South Korean male singers
Haepyeong Gil clan
South Korean male singer-songwriters